Tibaldo Rodney Arismendi Carrasco (21 March 1913, in Río Branco, Uruguay – 27 December 1989, in Montevideo) was a Uruguayan politician and political writer.

Biography
In 1930, he joined the Communist Party of Uruguay (PCU), which he represented at the Parliament between 1947 and 1973.

From 1955, he was secretary-general of the PCU; in 1971 the party became a constituent of the Frente Amplio. In 1974 he was imprisoned and in 1975 he was expelled from Uruguay by the military dictatorship and he was exiled in the Soviet Union.

He was considered one of the most important Latin American ideologues of Communism.

His daughter Marina Arismendi is also a PCU politician.

His great niece, the designer and artist Yanina Angelini Arismendi, is also a Communist writer and Civil Rights activist currently living in the southern USA.

Works 
 La filosofía del marxismo y el señor Haya de la Torre (Editorial "América". 1946)
 Para un prontuario del dólar (Al margen del Plan Truman) (Ediciones Pueblos Unidos. 1947)
 Problemas de una revolución continental (2 volúmenes. Ediciones Pueblos Unidos. 1962)
 Un instante de transición hacia batallas más altas (Ediciones de la Agrupación Comunista de Médicos. 1969)
 Lenin, la revolución y América Latina (Ediciones Pueblos Unidos. 1970)
 Insurgencia juvenil (Ediciones Pueblos Unidos. 1972)
 Sobre la enseñanza, la literatura y el arte (Ediciones Pueblos Unidos. 1984)
 Enseñanza democrática (1985)
 Ocho corazones latiendo (1987)

See also
 List of political families#Uruguay

References

External links 

   
 Fundación Rodney Arismendi

1913 births
1989 deaths
People from Río Branco, Uruguay
Uruguayan people of Basque descent
Communist Party of Uruguay politicians
Broad Front (Uruguay) politicians
Members of the Chamber of Representatives of Uruguay (1947–1951)
Members of the Chamber of Representatives of Uruguay (1951–1955)
Members of the Chamber of Representatives of Uruguay (1955–1959)
Members of the Chamber of Representatives of Uruguay (1959–1963)
Members of the Chamber of Representatives of Uruguay (1963–1967)
Members of the Chamber of Representatives of Uruguay (1967–1972)
Members of the Chamber of Representatives of Uruguay (1972–1973)
Uruguayan political writers
Marxist theorists
Uruguayan exiles
Uruguayan expatriates in the Soviet Union
People granted political asylum in the Soviet Union